Alpine skiing at the 1999 Winter Asian Games took place in the resort town of Yongpyong, Gangwon, South Korea with six events contested — three each for men and women. Slalom events were reinstated in this edition of the games after being substituted for Super Giant Slalom events in the 1996 Winter Asiad in Harbin, China.

Schedule

Medalists

Men

Women

Medal table

Participating nations
A total of 45 athletes from 12 nations competed in alpine skiing at the 1999 Asian Winter Games:

References
 Results of the Fourth Winter Asian Games
 Results

 
1999 Asian Winter Games events
1999
1999 in alpine skiing